Goniocraspedon mistura is a moth of the family Noctuidae first described by Charles Swinhoe in 1891. It is found in India, Sri Lanka and Australia.

References

Moths of Asia
Moths described in 1891